Nizhnekansiyarovo (Tübänge Qanhöyär) is a rural locality (a village) in Tuchubayevsky Selsoviet, Baltachevsky District, Bashkortostan, Russia. The population was 155 as of 2010. There are 3 streets.

Geography 
Verkhnekansiyarovo is the nearest rural locality.

References 

Rural localities in Baltachevsky District